Henry Hanley Funderburk (June 19, 1931 – August 4, 2012) was the President of Auburn University, from 1980 to 1983.

Biography
In 1980, Henry Hanley Funderburk became President of Auburn University after Governor Fob James recommended him. He was unpopular with the faculty, and resigned in 1983.

From 1984 to 1998 Funderburk served as president of Eastern Kentucky University.

In 1985, he became the President of the Southern Association of Colleges and Schools.

He died after a long illness in 2012.

Bibliography
 Factors affecting the response of Zea Mays L. and Sorghum helepense L. to sodium 2,2-dichloropropionate (1958)

References 

People from Carrollton, Alabama
Presidents of Auburn University
Presidents of Eastern Kentucky University
1931 births
2012 deaths
People from Wetumpka, Alabama